Plan A is the seventh studio album by German singer-songwriter Johannes Oerding. It was released through Columbia Records on 4 November 2022. The album became his second album to debut atop the German Albums Chart.

Critical reception

In his review for laut.de, Philipp Kause called Plan A "an embarrassing record whose predictable chart success makes others ashamed."

Chart performance
Plan A became Oerdings second consecutive studio album to debut at number one on the German Albums Chart.

Track listing

Charts

Weekly charts

Year-end charts

Release history

References

2022 albums
German-language albums
Johannes Oerding albums